Babiec-Więczanki  is a village in the administrative district of Gmina Rościszewo, within Sierpc County, Masovian Voivodeship, in East-Central Poland.

References

Villages in Sierpc County